The Christ Methodist Episcopal Church  in Denver, Colorado, also known as Scott Methodist Episcopal Church is a historic church at 2201 Ogden Street.  It was built in 1889 and was added to the National Register in 1976.

It is a two-story  plan building.

It was purchased by an African American congregation in 1927 and renamed for a pioneer black Methodist bishop. After this congregation moved to a different location, the church was rehabilitated as Sanctuary Lofts in 1995.

References

Colorado State Register of Historic Properties
Methodist churches in Colorado
Churches on the National Register of Historic Places in Colorado
Gothic Revival church buildings in Colorado
Churches completed in 1889
National Register of Historic Places in Denver
Churches in Denver
African-American history of Colorado